Grégory Arnolin (born 10 November 1980), known simply as Grégory, is a former professional footballer who played as a central defender. Born in France, he represented the Martinique national team internationally.

Club career
Arnolin was born in Livry-Gargan, Seine-Saint-Denis. At the age of 16 he signed a semi-professional contract with Paris Saint-Germain F.C. but, during his spell at the club, he never played for the first team.

In the summer of 2001, after a loan to Red Star FC, Arnolin's contract with PSG ran out and he became a free agent. He was quickly acquired by semi-professionals Villemomble Sports (also in Paris, competing in the fourth division) but, however, never appeared in a league match for the side, and in the summer of 2002 was released.

Arnolin then moved to Portugal, to play for F.C. Pedras Rubras in the third level. After solid performances he attracted attention from bigger clubs in the country, and eventually signed his first professional contract with Gil Vicente FC, in the Primeira Liga. In his second season he scored an impressive seven league goals for the Barcelos team, catching the eye of Madeira-based C.S. Marítimo and signing a two-year deal in late May 2006; after only missing one league game in his debut campaign, he played second-fiddle in the second (15 appearances).

On 12 June 2007, British sports channel Sky Sports reported that Arnolin was preparing to sign for West Bromwich Albion of the Football League Championship, after manager Tony Mowbray made it clear that the player was one of his summer transfer targets. The player's agent, former footballer Rudi Vata, said to the Birmingham Mail: "There is a good possibility that Grégory will join West Bromwich but there are still issues to be resolved. We should know more at the end of this month when people are back from holiday and all focus switches towards pre-season. I think there is a big chance he will be a West Bromwich player next season. He is well aware of how close they were to playing in the Premiership and the club's ambitions match his own. What we don't know yet is whether it would be a transfer for about £400,000 or a loan move – that is one of the issues we have to discuss".

However, nothing came of it and Arnolin remained in Marítimo. On 7 June 2008, he signed for another Portuguese team, Vitória de Guimarães, as he was also applying for Portuguese citizenship – during his spell in the country, he began being addressed by his first name.

On 24 June 2009, Grégory moved to Sporting de Gijón, on a three-year link. In only his third game for the Asturians he netted through a header, as 10-men Sporting levelled 2–2 at Valencia CF with just four minutes to go.

Grégory's importance at the club became gradually less important, and he only appeared in 14 league games in 2012–13, in division two. On 24 August 2014, after brief spells in Portugal with F.C. Paços de Ferreira and Atlético Clube de Portugal, he was drafted by FC Goa to play in the inaugural edition of the Indian Super League; he retired at the age of 36, and later worked for Portuguese sports agency ProEleven.

International career
In June 2013, aged nearly 33, Grégory was called up by Martinique for the 2013 CONCACAF Gold Cup. He made his debut in the tournament's opener, playing the full 90 minutes in a 1–0 win against Canada.

Career statistics

Club

References

External links

1980 births
Living people
People from Livry-Gargan
French people of Martiniquais descent
Footballers from Seine-Saint-Denis
French footballers
Martiniquais footballers
Association football defenders
Red Star F.C. players
Villemomble Sports players
Primeira Liga players
Liga Portugal 2 players
Segunda Divisão players
Gil Vicente F.C. players
C.S. Marítimo players
Vitória S.C. players
F.C. Paços de Ferreira players
Atlético Clube de Portugal players
La Liga players
Segunda División players
Sporting de Gijón players
Indian Super League players
FC Goa players
Martinique international footballers
2013 CONCACAF Gold Cup players
French expatriate footballers
Martiniquais expatriate footballers
Expatriate footballers in Portugal
Expatriate footballers in Spain
Expatriate footballers in India
French expatriate sportspeople in Portugal
French expatriate sportspeople in Spain
French expatriate sportspeople in India
Martiniquais expatriate sportspeople in Portugal
Martiniquais expatriate sportspeople in Spain
Martiniquais expatriate sportspeople in India